John Carson or similar, may refer to:

People

Entertainment
Johnny Carson (1925–2005), American television host and comedian
Fiddlin' John Carson (1868–1949), American musician
Jack Carson (1910–1963), Canadian-born, U.S. based actor
John Carson (actor) (1927–2016), English actor
John David Carson (1952–2009), American actor

Politics
John J. Carson (1888–1971), American politician who served in the Truman Administration
John Carson (Northern Ireland politician) (born 1933), Northern Ireland politician
Johnnie Carson (born 1943), United States diplomat
John Carson (Georgia politician), Georgia (US) politician

Other persons
Johnny Carson (American football) (1930–2009), American football player
John Carson (cricketer) (born 1945), New Zealand cricketer
John Renshaw Carson (1886–1940), transmission theorist
John Miller Carson Jr. (1864–1956), American general
John Carson (physician) (1752–1794), American medical doctor

Other uses
 "Johnny Carson" (song), a 1977 song by the Beach Boys off the album The Beach Boys Love You

See also

 
 Jack Carson (disambiguation)
 Carson (disambiguation)
 John (disambiguation)

Carson, John